Thine Be the Glory, Risen Conquering Son (French: À toi la gloire O Ressuscité), also titled Thine Is the Glory, is a Christian hymn for Easter, written by the Swiss Protestant minister, Edmond Budry (1854–1932), and set to the tune of the chorus "See, the Conqu'ring hero comes" from the third section of Handel's oratorio Judas Maccabaeus. The hymn is sometimes sung at weddings or funerals.

An English translation was made in 1923 by Richard Birch Hoyle (1875–1939). The German Advent hymn Tochter Zion, freue dich uses the same tune.

History

Tune
"Thine Be the Glory" is sung to the hymn tune . The tune was originally written by the German-British composer George Frideric Handel. He composed it initially for his 1747 oratorio Joshua, in which it features as a chorus, "See, the Conquering Hero Comes!", celebrating the military victories of the Biblical figure Joshua. The chorus is sung three times, and its final rendition is accompanied by a military side drum. It is thought that Handel may have taken inspiration from a march in Componimenti musicali written by Georg Muffat. Handel was confident that the tune would prove popular, and claimed to the music historian John Hawkins that “You will live to see it a greater favourite with the people than my other fine things.” So confident was Handel of its popularity that he added the chorus to his other oratorio Judas Maccabaeus, written the previous year. "See, the Conquering Hero Comes!" was repurposed to celebrate the military victory of another Old Testament figure, Judas Maccabaeus. Handel's tune bears some historic anti-Jacobite associations. The composition of Judas Maccabaeus was reportedly influenced by Frederick, Prince of Wales; the subject matter of an old testament military victory was chosen as an oblique tribute to the victory of his brother, the Duke of Cumberland, at the Battle of Culloden in April 1746.

In 1796, Ludwig van Beethoven composed twelve variations on "See, the Conquering Hero Comes!" for both piano and cello.

Text

Handel's popular chorus tune was first put to use as a hymn tune in Harmonia Sacra, a hymnal compiled in 1754 by Thomas Butts, in which it is used as a setting for Charles Wesley's hymn "Christ the Lord Is Risen Today". His choice of Handel's militaristic theme was intended to reinforce the metaphor the resurrected Christ as a victorious warrior who has vanquished death and the powers of evil.

In 1884, Handel's tune was used as a setting for a new French-language hymn, "A Toi la Gloire." It was written by Edmond Louis Budry, a minister of the Swiss Eglise évangélique du Canton de Vaud. It is reported that he was inspired to write it after the death of his first wife, Marie de Vayenborg in Lausanne, Switzerland. It was later published in French hymn book Chants Evangéliques (1885), 
and in the YMCA Hymnbook (1904).

The hymn was first translated from French into English by Richard Birch Hoyle in 1923. He was commissioned to translate the hymn by the World Student Christian Federation after Budry granted authorisation to reproduce it from the French version. It was later published in the World Student Christian Federation's hymn book, Cantate Domino Hymnal. World Student Christian Federation retained copyright on Hoyle's English translation. The hymn's popularity was cemented when it was included in The Methodist Hymn Book in 1933. Today it features in several popular hymnals, including The New English Hymnal Singing the Faith and The Church Hymnary.

The hymn makes particular reference to verses of the First Epistle to the Corinthians in the New Testament (1 Corinthians 15). The central theme of the victorious Christ is drawn from : "But thanks be to God, which giveth us the victory through our Lord Jesus Christ.", while line in the second verse of the hymn, "death hath lost its sting", is taken directly from : "O death, where is thy sting? O grave, where is thy victory?". The line "No more we doubt thee" may also be a reference to Doubting Thomas.

Other versions
Sung to an alternative text beginning "Praised be the Father", Händel's tune is also used as a wedding hymn. The German Advent hymn  was written by Friedrich Heinrich Ranke using the same tune. The hymn was translated into Danish in 1993 and is currently no. 240 in Den Danske Salmebog with the title . It is listed under Easter psalms, but it also considered appropriate for funerals.

Usage 
The hymn is often used in Easter church services involving the British royal family. It was also played during a service of thanksgiving in commemoration of Queen Elizabeth II's 80th birthday. The hymn is also used during funerals and is listed in the Church of England's funeral services hymn book.  During the Last Night of the Proms in the United Kingdom, Thine Be the Glory is played after Fantasia on British Sea Songs with attendees traditionally whistling the tune.

In the Netherlands, the original French version is sung during funerals and weddings of the Dutch Royal Family.

Lyrics 
Below are the original lyrics by Edmond Budry with a literal English translation, and Hoyle's translation:

Tune 
The following setting, based on Handel's original, is from the collection "Complete Anglican Hymns Old and New".

References

French Christian hymns
Easter hymns
Protestant hymns
1884 songs
19th-century hymns
Commons category link is locally defined